Udaynath College of Science and Technology is in Cuttack near Adaspur market on the bank of the holy Prachi River in India. It was founded in 1984 by Udaynath Sahoo, after whom the college is named. It became a fully fledged undergraduate college in 1991. The college has 60 to 70 teaching staff in its departments and provides education in arts, science and commerce, and self-financing courses like BBA, BCA, B.Sc. ITM, B.Sc. Computer Science, M.Sc. Computer Science and MFC to students from the local area and other districts of Odisha. 

This college is well connected with cities like Bhubaneshwar, Cuttack, Konark, Puri and Kakatpur by State Highway 60. It is in a rural town setting with a calm and serene environment for studying.

Udaynath College of Science and Technology provides a better class of rooms and practical labs to its students. The University Grants Commission has highly appreciated its standards, and it has been given autonomous status.

Science stream- The science stream of the college especially department of zoology is one of the  finest departments in state education system. There are several rare snake species preserved with chemical fluids so that students can do research with such species and also gain knowledge regarding biological evolution. Similarly  the department of botany includes an academically rich botanical lab with so many rare plant species as well as a well maintained botanical garden inside the campus compound. Students graduating from the institute have done enormous research work in higher education sector of country.

References

External links

Universities and colleges in Odisha
Education in Cuttack
1987 establishments in Orissa
Educational institutions established in 1987